Caloptilia vicinola is a moth of the family Gracillariidae. It is known from South Africa and Zimbabwe.

The larvae feed on Monanthotaxis species. They mine the leaves of their host plant. The mine has the form of an irregular, transparent blotch-mine, often between two parallel veins and thus having an irregular square shape.

References

vicinola
Lepidoptera of South Africa
Lepidoptera of Zimbabwe
Moths of Sub-Saharan Africa
Moths described in 1961